Dr. Hazel A. Barton is an English born microbiologist, geologist and cave diving explorer, interested in extremophile microorganisms. She is a Professor and Director of the Integrated Bioscience Program at the University of Akron and has appeared in several documentaries.

Early life
Hazel Barton grew up in Bristol, England and first experienced caving through an Outward Bound course when she was 16, which was the beginning of her life-long involvement with caving.

Career
She moved to the United States six years after she started caving as a hobby and in the early 1990s studied for her PhD at the University of Colorado Health Sciences Center, in Boulder, Colorado undertaking research into drug resistant tuberculosis. After graduating, she carried out postdoctoral research with Norman R. Pace, who was also keen on caving. She became increasingly disinterested in medical microbiology and he encouraged her to consider applying modern microbiological technology, especially culture independent methods, to the microbiology of caves. This was the start of her independent research career. She was appointed the Ashland Endowed Professor of Integrative Science and an Assistant Professor in the Department of Biological Sciences, Northern Kentucky University in 2003 and is currently a Professor and Director of the Integrated Bioscience Program at the University of Akron

Barton studies the microbiome of caves, especially adaptations to nutrient-limitation.  She considers that the microbes can be involved in the formation of caves. She is also interested in the fungus Pseudogymnoascus destructans, the causative agent of White-nose Syndrome in bats. These take advantage of her expertise in caving and have led her to caves in every continent, including Antarctica.

Bibliography
Barton is the author or co-author of more than 25 publications on cave research and extremophile bacteria. These include:

Books and Popular Works 

 Whitaker, R.J. and Barton, Hazel A. Women in Microbiology (American Society for Microbiology Press, Washington, DC. ).
 Aulenbach, Nancy Holler and Barton, Hazel A., with Delano, Marfe Ferguson. Co-authored the children's book Exploring Caves: Journeys Into The Earth. National Geographic Books, March 2001. Winner of the Outstanding Science Trade Book for 2001 by the National Science Teachers

Primary publications
 Reynolds, H.T., Barton, H.A. and Slot, J.C. 2016 Phylogenomic analysis supports a recent change in nitrate assimilation in the White-nose Syndrome pathogen, Pseudogymnoascus destructans. Fungal Ecology 23: 20-29.

Reviews

 Association and Children's Book Council.   Based on their 2001 film.

Media appearances
Barton co-starred with Nancy Holler Aulenbach in the 2001 IMAX film Journey into Amazing Caves.
In December 2006, Barton was featured on Animal Planet's The Real Lost World.  Both featured Barton's research involving caves and the microbial life that inhabit these harsh environments.

In 2008, she was part of the TV movie documentary How Life Began and in the TV documentary series Catastrophe in the segment Snowball Earth.  
In 2010, she was in the segment 'Arrival' of the TV documentary series First Life. 
In 2012, she appeared in 'Defeating the Superbugs' of the TV documentary series Horizon.
In 2012, she appeared in 'Defeating the Superbugs' in the TV documentary series Horizon.	
In 2013, she was in a short documentary named Bat House and in the TV Series How the Earth Works episode Ice Age or Hell Fire?.

She was one of the scientists featured in the History Channel special Journey to the Center of the World, documenting the exploration of the Guatemalan cave Naj Tunich, which was used as a sacred site by the ancient Maya.
She was included in the children's book Extreme Scientists: Exploring Nature's Mysteries from Perilous Places (Scientist in the Field) by Donna M. Jackson.

Awards
 In 2010, 2011 and 2013 the Barton Lab was listed as one of the ‘top ten most awesome research labs’ by Popular Science magazine
 In 2016 she was named a Science Hero by The My Hero Project. 
 In 2018 she received the Alice C. Evans Award from the American Society for Microbiology for her work in fostering the inclusion, development and advancement of women in microbiology.

External links 

Hazel Barton, University of Akron Department of Biology, 2015
This Week in TWiM #51: Cave science with Hazel Barton Microbeworld.org, Microbiology Archives, podcast, n.d.,79 minutes
MTS37 – Hazel Barton – Cave Dwellers Microbeworld.org, Microbiology Archives, podcast, n.d., 24 minutes

References

1972 births
Living people
British microbiologists
British women geologists
British speleologists
University of Akron faculty
Northern Kentucky University faculty
Scientists from Bristol
Women microbiologists
Geomicrobiologists
Cave diving explorers
Kentucky women scientists
American women academics
21st-century American women